This is a list of Finnish jazz musicians notable enough for Wikipedia articles.

A
Aaltonen, Juhani "Junnu" (saxophonist, flutist, composer)
Aaltonen, Tapani "Mongo" (percussionist)
Assefa, Abdissa "Mamba" (percussionist)

B
Björkenheim, Raoul (guitarist, composer)

D
Donner, Otto (trumpetist, composer, arranger, producer)

E
Engberg, Peter (guitarist)
Eskelinen, Rami (drummer)
Eskola, Jukka (trumpetist)

F
Försti, Johanna (singer)

G
Gustavson, Jukka (pianist, organist, composer)

H
Haarla, Iro (pianist, harpist, keyboardist, composer)
Halkosalmi, Veli-Matti "Vellu" (composer, arranger, trombonist, teacher)
Hauta-Aho, Teppo (bassist, composer)
Heikinheimo, Ilmari (drummer, composer)
Heikkinen, Esko (trumpetist, conductor)
Heinilä, Kari "Sonny" (flutist, saxophonist, composer)
Herrala, Ville (bassist)
Hytti, Antti (bassist, composer)

I
Iivanainen, Johanna (singer, composer)
Ikonen, Osmo (singer, cellist)
Innanen, Mikko (saxophonist, composer)

J
Jalava, Pertti "Peppe" (drummer, pianist, composer)
Johansson, Markku (trumpetist, composer, arranger, conductor)

K
Kalima, Kalle (guitarist, composer)
Keskitalo, Petri (tubist)
Koivistoinen, Eero (saxophonist, composer)
Kortehisto, Juha "Jay" (trombonist, singer)
Koski, Tuure (bassist)
Kujala, Veli (accordionist)
Kukko, Sakari (saxophonist, composer)
Kuoppamäki, Sami (drummer)
Kähärä, Anna-Mari (singer, composer, arranger, producer)
Kämäräinen, Timo (guitarist, composer)

L
Linkola, Jukka (pianist, composer)
Louhivuori, Olavi (drummer, composer)

P
Pohjola, Mika (pianist, composer)
Pohjola, Pekka (bassist, composer)
Pohjola, Verneri (trumpeter)
Pöyhönen, Valtteri Laurell (guitarist, pianist, composer, bandleader, producer)

R
Rantala, Iiro (pianist, composer, teacher)

S
Sarmanto, Heikki (pianist, composer)
Sarmanto, Pekka (bassist)
Sarpila, Antti (clarinetist, saxophonist, composer, conductor)
Savolainen, Jarmo (pianist, keyboardist, composer)Tenor
Siikasaari, Eerik (bassist)

T
Tenor, Jimi (saxophonist, multi-instrumentalist, composer)

V
Vartiainen, Tomi "Varre" (guitarist)
Vesala, Edward (drummer, composer)

W
Walli, Hasse (guitarist)

See also
List of Finnish singers
List of Finnish musicians
Music of Finland

External links 
 Jazz Finland: A catalog of all the Finnish jazz professionals and releases.

Jazz
Finnish